Sophora stenophylla, the fringeleaf necklacepod, or silvery sophora, is a perennial plant in the legume family (Fabaceae) found in the Colorado Plateau and Canyonlands region of the southwestern United States.

Description

Growth pattern
Its lacy leaves and blue to purple flowers make it very distinctive in its communities. It spreads by underground roots.

Leaves and stems
It has alternate, lacy, compound pinnate leaves with linear leaflets that are covered in dense, soft, and silvery hairs.

Inflorescence and fruit
It blooms from April to May. The terminal stalks bear 12–39 blue to purple, pea-shaped flowers. Seed pods have short, stiff hairs and 1–5 seeds.

Habitat and range
It can be found in sandy soils in blackbrush scrub, pinyon-juniper woodland, and ponderosa pine forest communities in southern Utah, Arizona, and New Mexico.

Ecological and human interactions
Its foliage and seeds are toxic to livestock in large amounts.

References

stenophylla
Flora of the United States
Flora of Arizona
Perennial plants
Flora of New Mexico